Lasionycta perplexella is a moth of the family Noctuidae. It is found from southern Yukon to southern Alberta and southern Washington.

The habitat is subalpine spruce and fir forest.

The wingspan is 30–36 mm for males and 33–36 mm for females. Adults are on wing from mid-July through August.

External links
A Revision of Lasionycta Aurivillius (Lepidoptera, Noctuidae) for North America and notes on Eurasian species, with descriptions of 17 new species, 6 new subspecies, a new genus, and two new species of Tricholita Grote

Lasionycta
Moths described in 2009